Crime Scene (also known as Criminology elsewhere) is an adventure game for the Nintendo DS. It was released on February 16, 2010.

Plot
Newly appointed forensics detective Matt Simmons must solve his first case, which is the double murder of a co-worker and his wife.

Gameplay
Players will be able to use the touch screen to access certain features which can be used to solve crimes, including a messaging system which allows the player to be told clues from NPCs. The player can also interview NPCs that they encounter. The stylus can be used to scan the crime scene and the color of the cursor will change to indicate that the player has found an important object. Collecting evidence requires the player to pick up the piece of evidence and put it in a bucket of solution, and pressing a button when a meter appears to try to get the object to stay in the solution. The player will be able to dust for fingerprints by using a brush to leave powder over the prints and blowing into the microphone to remove excess dust. DNA can be analyzed by using a pipette to put the material onto a slide. The stylus can then be used to remove unwanted cells so that only the evidence is present. The player also has a credibility meter which will change depending on the players actions throughout the game.

Reception
Randy Nelson from Nintendo Power said that while the game was able to replicate the feel of crime scene investigations, it falters with unimaginative case files, "poorly translated" writing and basic game mechanics, concluding that "Yes, it sounds like Phoenix Wright in that respect, but Crime Scene has none of the charm, character, or creativity of Capcom's courtroom series."

References

2010 video games
Adventure games
Crime investigation simulators
Nintendo DS games
Nintendo DS-only games
Single-player video games
SouthPeak Games
Video games about police officers
Video games developed in France